An isolation index is a measure of the segregation of the activities of multiple populations. They have been used in studies of racial segregation and ideological segregation.

Examples of isolation indices include Lieberson's isolation index and Bell's isolation index.

References

See also 
 Diversity index
 Index of dissimilarity

Demography
Index numbers